Merkhah Al Ulya District is a district of the Shabwah Governorate in Yemen. As of 2003, the district had a population of 32,278 people.

References

Districts of Shabwah Governorate